In theoretical physics, the Penrose transform, introduced by , is a complex analogue of the Radon transform that relates massless fields on spacetime to cohomology of sheaves on complex projective space.  The projective space in question is the twistor space, a geometrical space naturally associated to the original spacetime, and the twistor transform is also geometrically natural in the sense of integral geometry.  The Penrose transform is a major component of classical twistor theory.

Overview

Abstractly, the Penrose transform operates on a double fibration of a space Y, over two spaces X and Z

In the classical Penrose transform, Y is the spin bundle, X is a compactified and complexified form of Minkowski space and Z is the twistor space.  More generally examples come from double fibrations of the form

where G is a complex semisimple Lie group and H1 and H2 are parabolic subgroups.

The Penrose transform operates in two stages.  First, one pulls back the sheaf cohomology groups Hr(Z,F) to the sheaf cohomology Hr(Y,η−1F) on Y; in many cases where the Penrose transform is of interest, this pullback turns out to be an isomorphism.  One then pushes the resulting cohomology classes down to X; that is, one investigates the direct image of a cohomology class by means of the Leray spectral sequence.  The resulting direct image is then interpreted in terms of differential equations.  In the case of the classical 
Penrose transform, the resulting differential equations are precisely the massless field equations for a given spin.

Example

The classical example is given as follows
The "twistor space" Z is complex projective 3-space CP3, which is also the Grassmannian Gr1(C4) of lines in 4-dimensional complex space.
X = Gr2(C4), the Grassmannian of 2-planes in 4-dimensional complex space. This is a compactification of complex Minkowski space.
Y is the flag manifold whose elements correspond to a line in a plane of C4.
G is the group  SL4(C) and H1 and H2 are the parabolic subgroups fixing a line or a plane containing this line.

The maps from Y to X and Z are the natural projections.

Penrose–Ward transform

 used this to describe instantons in terms of  algebraic vector bundles on complex projective 3-space and  explained how this could be used to classify instantons on a 4-sphere.

References

.

; Doctor of Philosophy thesis.

.

Integral geometry